Clinton Hill  is a neighborhood within the south-central portion of the city of Newark in Essex County, New Jersey, United States. It is centered at Clinton Avenue, and bounded roughly by Elizabeth Avenue in the east, Hawthorne Avenue in the south, Avon Avenue in the north, and Irvington in the west.

Upper Clinton Hill is predominantly residential, with many of the homes also being the offices of professionals. Most retail activity along Clinton and Hawthorne Avenues is in the form of neighborhood-oriented convenience-type stores. Residents can patronize a shopping center on Chancellor Avenue near the Irvington border or one on nearby Springfield Ave.  Nearest to the commercial streets, the housing is largely two- and three-family conversions, while the interior streets include many large, well-maintained single-family houses. To the south, near I-78, are several vacant and abandoned properties. There is some light industry in the southeastern part of the neighborhood.   Hawthorne Hill is the southwest section of Upper Clinton Hill.  The Hawthorne Hill/Upper Clinton Hill neighborhoods are served by the Newark Public Library's Madison branch.

M&M's first factory was at 285 Badger Avenue in the neighborhood.  It is now a vacant lot.

Newark's highest concentration of vacant land and empty buildings can be found in the Lower Clinton Hill neighborhood. Whole blocks of vacant land can be seen, much of it cleared of all but a few clusters of older residences. Indeed, more than half the neighborhood is vacant land. There is some commercial activity along Avon Avenue and at the intersection of Peddie Street and Elizabeth Avenue and a scattering of small, convenience-oriented businesses on Clinton Avenue and Bergen Street.  The Lower Clinton Hill neighborhood is served by the Newark Public Library's Clinton branch.

History
The name refers to the no-longer extant Clinton Township, Essex County, New Jersey, of which the neighborhood was once part.

A three-block long street that extends from Runyon St. is called Tillinghast Street, believed named after Philip Tillinghast, who moved there in 1854 or early 1855 with his family of seven children from Manhattan.  Philip was a well-to-do commission merchant and broker who worked in the Wall Street area and lived near fashionable Washington Square in the 1840s.  As commercialization and immigration overtook such Dutch and English Old New York Protestant neighborhoods, wealthy families moved further uptown into free-standing mansions or townhouses made of newly discovered chocolate sandstone (Brownstone) from Paterson, New Jersey.

Others were influenced by writers like Andrew Jackson Downing and Davis who advocated villa living in semi-rural areas in the Bronx, Brooklyn, Staten Island, and the Orange area of New Jersey, where Llewellyn Park was created in West Orange.  Tillinghast also joined the land speculators during this era to establish a suburban enclave of wealthy families in what was then Clinton Township.  His home, thought to be called Hawthorn Hill, was located in this area with green spaces and punctuated by churches such as St. Andrews Episcopal and First Presbyterian on Clinton Ave. to serve the WASP (white Anglo-Saxon Protestant) population that inhabited the new neighborhood.  Philip was ruined in the Panic of 1873.

A daughter, Mary Elizabeth Tillinghast, was a famous embroidery and stained glass window artist (Grace Church, New-York Historical Society, St. Vincent's Hospital chapel) who had been a partner of John La Farge before going on her own.  She moved back to NYC after Philip died in 1879, and lived at 3 N. Washington Square, near her old house.  When she died in 1912, her studio was taken by Edward Hopper.

Gradually, immigration spread out from Newark and surrounded this enclave, whose inhabitants  moved further westward to West Orange (and St. Mark Episcopal church and 'new' Presbyterian church on Main Street).  Left behind were mostly lower middle-class Ukrainian-Americans and Jewish-Americans. Now it is mostly lower-income African-American.

References

External links
Map: 

Neighborhoods in Newark, New Jersey